Teresa Sukniewicz-Kleiber (born 10 November 1948) is a retired Polish hurdler. She competed in the women's 80 metres hurdles at the 1968 Summer Olympics.

References

1948 births
Living people
Athletes (track and field) at the 1968 Summer Olympics
Polish female hurdlers
Olympic athletes of Poland
Athletes from Warsaw
Universiade medalists in athletics (track and field)
Universiade gold medalists for Poland
Medalists at the 1970 Summer Universiade